Noah The New Year 2023 was a professional wrestling event promoted by CyberFight's sub-brand Pro Wrestling Noah. It took place on January 1, 2023, in Tokyo, Japan, at the Nippon Budokan. The event aired on CyberAgent's AbemaTV online linear television service and CyberFight's streaming service Wrestle Universe. It was the first pay-per-view promoted by Noah in 2023.

Background

Storylines
The event featured eleven professional wrestling matches that resulted from scripted storylines, where wrestlers portrayed villains, heroes, or less distinguishable characters in the scripted events that built tension and culminated in a wrestling match or series of matches.

Event

Preliminary matches
The show started with the confrontation between Yasutaka Yano and Taishi Ozawa which ended with the latter's victory. In the second bout, Daiki Inaba, Masa Kitamiya, and Yoshiki Inamura picked up a victory over Akitoshi Saito, Muhammad Yone, and Shuhei Taniguchi. Next, Alejandro, Dante Leon and Ninja Mack defeated Kongo (Hi69, Shuji Kondo and Tadasuke). The fourth match saw Dragon Gate's Masaaki Mochizuki, Susumu Mochizuki and Mochizuki Jr. picking up a voctory over El Hijo del Dr. Wagner Jr. and Stinger's Atsushi Kotoge and Seiki Yoshioka. Next, another loss of Kongo's stable was represented by Katsuhiko Nakajima, Masakatsu Funaki, Manabu Soya and Hajime Ohara in front of Kazuyuki Fujita, Kendo Kashin, Nosawa Rongai and Hiroshi Hase, where Hase was revealed as the mystery partner. The sixth match saw Jack Morris defeating Timothy Thatcher. After the match concluded, Jake Lee appeared and alligned himself with Morris. Next, Amakusa secured his first defense of the GHC Junior Heavyweight Championship against Junta Miyawaki. Later on, Takashi Sugiura and Satoshi Kojima secured their third defense of the GHC Tag Team Championship against New Japan Pro Wrestling's Kenta and Naomichi Marufuji. In the eighth bout, Yoshinari Ogawa and Los Perros del Mal de Japón's Eita defeated Yo-Hey and Kzy to win the GHC Junior Heavyweight Tag Team Championship. In the semi main event, Kaito Kiyomiya secured the third defense of the GHC Heavyweight Championship against Kenoh.

Main event
The show's main event portraited the final Noah appearance of The Great Muta before his retirement ceremony which will occur on February 21, 2023. He faced WWE's Shinsuke Nakamura in a losing effort which concluded in little over eighteen minutes. The match ended after a "green mist" and a Kinshasa. After the match, Nakamura helped Muta up, showing a sign of respect and sportsmanship.

Results

References

External links
Pro Wrestling Noah official website

Pro Wrestling Noah
CyberAgent
2023 in professional wrestling
January 2023 events in Japan
Professional wrestling in Tokyo
Pro Wrestling Noah shows